Vaishali Desai is an Indian model and actress. She won the Indian title of Miss International. She debuted in the film Kal Kissne Dekha.

Early life
Vaishali Desai is a Gujarati. She is the grandniece of filmmaker Manmohan Desai.

Vaishali was brought up in Bangalore. Vaishali did her schooling in Sophia High School, Bangalore. She finished her graduation from Mount Carmel College, Bangalore. After her Miss India contest she shifted her base to Mumbai with her family for modelling and further studies.

Vaishali was doing ramp shows in Bangalore and was a top model. Her first show was when she was fourteen. Her major break and entry in the acting world was with her first commercial for Ponds Dreamflower Talc. She later was seen in ads like Tanishq, Compaq, Raymonds. Vaishali has, however, not changed her name to Vyshalee Desai as given in her debut film Kal Kissne Dekha. Vaishali recently starred in a short psychological horror film titled Similitude, the film was officially selected at the 23rd Busan International Film Festival and competed under the Asian Short Film Competition Category.

Modelling and advertisements
She was seen in a Compaq laptop ad and in the very famous Raymond ad. She is now being seen in another Tanishq ad with Nafisa Ali. She has done ads for products like Swarnam Oil and Power detergent. Vaishali was seen in an ad with Shah Rukh Khan for Sunfeast, and in a Dabur Gulabari ad.

Vaishali did her first video for Kumar Sanu for the song 'Aisa na dekho Mujhe.' She did three videos for the band Euphoria. She did "Soneya" with them which was followed by "Mehfuz" which was directed by Pradeep Sarkar.

Vaishali had participated in the Elite Look of the Year contest and was the second runner-up. Vaishali participated in the Pond's Femina Miss India contest and was the third runner-up becoming the Miss India International even though she wasn't in the five finalists. Vaishali then left in the same year for the Miss International contest in Tokyo but failed to win due to her having conjunctivitis.

Vaishali has done ramp shows for top Indian designers. She has participated in the Lakme Fashion Week, Dhaka Fashion Week, and Sri Lankan Fashion week and done shows for L'Oréal, Moschino, etc. She has done a lot of print and editorial work as well.

Filmography

References

External links

21st-century Indian actresses
Living people
Year of birth missing (living people)
Gujarati people
Actresses in Hindi cinema
Miss International 2005 delegates
Actresses from Mumbai
Mount Carmel College, Bangalore alumni